Symphony No. 60 may refer to:

Joseph Haydn's Symphony No. 60 in C major
Alan Hovhaness's Symphony No. 60, Op. 396, To the Appalachian Mountains

060